Bembecia fokidensis is a moth of the family Sesiidae. It is found in Greece.

The wingspan is about 20 mm.

The larvae bore the roots of Trifolium species, including Trifolium fragiferum.

References

Moths described in 1991
Sesiidae
Moths of Europe